The Moscow Declarations were four declarations signed during the Moscow Conference on October 30, 1943. The declarations are distinct from the Communique that was issued following the Moscow Conference of 1945. They were signed by the foreign secretaries of the governments of the United States, the United Kingdom, the Soviet Union and the Republic of China. Four declarations were signed at the conference: The Declaration of the Four Nations on General Security, the Declaration on Italy, the Declaration on Austria, and the Declarations on Atrocities.

Declarations

Declaration of the Four Nations on General Security

In the section Joint Four-Nation Declaration, the governments of the United States of America, United Kingdom, the Soviet Union, and Nationalist China, in accordance with the declaration by United Nations of January 1942, and subsequent declarations, to continue hostilities against those Axis powers with which they respectively are at war until such powers have laid down their arms on the basis of unconditional surrender. They also recognize the necessity of establishing at the earliest practicable date a general international organization (the United Nations), based on the principle of the sovereign equality of all peace-loving states, and open to membership by all such states, large and small, for the maintenance of international peace and security.

Declaration on Italy
In the Declaration on Italy, the foreign secretaries of the US, UK and USSR declared that fascism and its influence should be completely destroyed and that the Italian people should be given every opportunity to establish governmental and other institutions based on democratic principles.

Declaration on Austria
In the Declaration on Austria, the Foreign Secretaries of US, UK and USSR declared that the annexation (Anschluss) of Austria by Germany was null and void. It called for the establishment of a free Austria after the victory over Nazi Germany.

Declaration on Atrocities

The Declaration on Atrocities was signed by the U.S. President Franklin D. Roosevelt, British Prime Minister Winston Churchill and Soviet Premier Joseph Stalin. They noted that "evidence of atrocities, massacres and cold-blooded mass executions which are being perpetrated by Hitlerite forces in many of the countries they have overrun and from which they are now being steadily expelled". They went on to state that Germans would be sent back to the countries where they had committed their crimes and "judged on the spot by the peoples whom they have outraged".  As for those Germans whose criminal offenses had no particular geographical localization, they would be punished by joint decision of the governments of the Allies.

The Statement on Atrocities was largely drafted by Winston Churchill, and led to the setting up of the European Advisory Commission which drafted the London Charter.

References

1943 documents
Politics of World War II
1943 in Austria
1943 in Italy
Treaties of the Soviet Union
Soviet Union–United Kingdom relations
Soviet Union–United States treaties
Austria–Soviet Union relations
World War II treaties
Treaties concluded in 1943
1943 in the Soviet Union
United Kingdom–United States treaties
1943 in Moscow
United Kingdom in World War II